Coryton railway station serves Coryton and Pantmawr in Cardiff, Wales.

Passenger services are provided by Transport for Wales as part of the Valley Lines network.

History
The station was opened by the Cardiff Railway on 1 March 1911 as Coryton Halt; it was renamed Coryton Halt (Glam) by the Great Western Railway in 1926, and relocated in 1931. The line beyond here closed to all traffic in 1952. It was proposed for closure in the Beeching Report of 1963, but survived. The station was renamed Coryton on 5 May 1969.

Facilities
There is one platform with a single bus-stop style shelter and benches. The station has two entrances, one wheelchair accessible from Park Crescent and one down a flight of steps from the A4054 road bridge over the track.

Services
Monday to Saturdays there is a half-hourly service along the City Line to Radyr, calling at Whitchurch, Rhiwbina, Birchgrove, Ty Glas, Heath Low Level, Cardiff Queen Street, Cardiff Central, Ninian Park, Waun-Gron Park, Fairwater, Danescourt and Radyr. Evenings there is an hourly service and there is no Sunday service.

Journey time to Queen Street is 15 minutes, Central 19 minutes and Radyr 39 minutes. Connections can be made at Queen Street for other Valley Lines services and at Central for main-line destinations across the country.

Services are mainly operated by  Class 150 Sprinter units. Saturdays often see single-carriage Class 153 Super Sprinter units, as services are less busy and two-car units can be freed for busier services.

See also
List of railway stations in Cardiff
Rail transport in Cardiff

References

External links

Railway stations in Cardiff
DfT Category F1 stations
Former Cardiff Railway stations
Railway stations in Great Britain opened in 1911
Railway stations served by Transport for Wales Rail